China's Schindler may refer to:

 John Rabe, German businessman who provided refuge for Chinese civilians during the Nanjing Massacre
 Ho Feng-Shan, Chinese diplomat who issued visas to Jews in Nazi controlled Austria allowing them to leave the country

See also
 Schindler (disambiguation)